In linear algebra, functional analysis and related areas of mathematics, a quasinorm is similar to a norm in that it satisfies the norm axioms, except that the triangle inequality is replaced by

for some

Related concepts 

Definition: A quasinorm on a vector space  is a real-valued map  on  that satisfies the following conditions:
Non-negativity: 
Absolute homogeneity:  for all  and all scalars 
there exists a  such that  for all 

If  is a quasinorm on  then  induces a vector topology on  whose neighborhood basis at the origin is given by the sets:

as  ranges over the positive integers. 
A topological vector space (TVS) with such a topology is called a quasinormed space. 

Every quasinormed TVS is a pseudometrizable. 

A vector space with an associated quasinorm is called a quasinormed vector space.

A complete quasinormed space is called a quasi-Banach space.

A quasinormed space  is called a quasinormed algebra if the vector space  is an algebra and there is a constant  such that 

for all 

A complete quasinormed algebra is called a quasi-Banach algebra.

Characterizations 

A topological vector space (TVS) is a quasinormed space if and only if it has a bounded neighborhood of the origin.

See also

References

 
 
 
 
  

Linear algebra
Norms (mathematics)